Noisy Noises is a 1929 Our Gang short silent comedy film directed by Robert F. McGowan. It was the 82nd Our Gang short that was released.

Cast

The Gang
 Joe Cobb as Joe
 Jean Darling as Jean
 Allen Hoskins as Farina
 Bobby Hutchins as Wheezer
 Mary Ann Jackson as Mary Ann
 Harry Spear as Harry
 Warren Mills as Rupert
 George Dunning as Our Gang member
 Andy Shuford as Our Gang member
 Gordon Thorpe as Our Gang member
 Pete the Pup as Himself

Additional cast
 Jay R. Smith as Kid at the dentist
 Edith Fortier as Pedestrian
 Fred Holmes as Bald man on the stairs
 Tenen Holtz as Man practicing the fiddle
 Michael Mark as Music teacher
 John B. O'Brien as Lemon vendor
 Lyle Tayo as Joe's mother
 Bret Black as Undetermined role

See also
 Our Gang filmography

References

External links

1929 films
American silent short films
American black-and-white films
1929 comedy films
Films directed by Robert F. McGowan
Hal Roach Studios short films
Our Gang films
1920s American films
Silent American comedy films
1920s English-language films